"Shook Ones (Part II)" is the lead single from Mobb Deep's 1995 album The Infamous.... The song is a sequel to the group's 1994 promotional single "Shook Ones", with similar lyrics, but less profanity. The original song is featured on the b-side of some releases of "Shook Ones, Part II" and was also included on the international version of the group's album Hell on Earth. The narrative is told from the perspective of inner-city youths engaged in territorial warfare and struggling for financial gains. The phrase "shook one" refers to someone who acts tough and hardcore but when faced with murder and crime, they are scared and run away.

The song contains a pitched down sample of "Jessica" by Herbie Hancock and "Kitty with the Bent Frame" by Quincy Jones. The drum break is sampled from "Dirty Feet" by Daly-Wilson Big Band. The Herbie Hancock sample was slowed down and the pitch was altered to create the beat in the song.

In 1997, the song was sampled by Mariah Carey in her single "The Roof (Back in Time)". For its single remix, Mobb Deep recorded additional raps and also appeared in the music video.

In 2010 Pitchfork Media included the song at number 25 on their Top 200 Tracks of the 90s. Rolling Stone magazine placed the song on its list of The 50 Greatest Hip-Hop Songs of All Time and their list of the "Top 500 Best Songs of All Time" at No. 215. while Complex ranked "Shook Ones (Part II)" at #23 on their list of the 25 most violent rap songs of all time.

The song appears in the 2005 video games Grand Theft Auto: Liberty City Stories in the in-game radio station The Liberty Jam and in True Crime: New York City. It also appears in NBA 2K13 and NBA 2K18.

Track listing
"Shook Ones (Part II)" (LP version) — 5:26
"Shook Ones (Part II)" (instrumental) — 4:41
"Shook Ones (Part II)" (A Cappella) — 3:49
"Shook Ones (Part I)" (original Version) — 4:13
"Shook Ones (Part I)" (instrumental) — 4:13

Charts

Weekly charts

Certifications

References

1995 songs
Mobb Deep songs
Sequel songs
Hardcore hip hop songs
RCA Records singles
Loud Records singles
Song recordings produced by Havoc (musician)
Songs written by Havoc (musician)
Songs written by Prodigy (rapper)